News of the Weird is a syndicated newspaper column once edited by Chuck Shepherd  that collects bizarre news stories. It was created in 1988. , it is syndicated by Universal Press Syndicate and published in more than 250 newspapers in the United States and Canada. As of July 2008, the daily internet column has merged with two other "weird" websites to form Weird Universe.

Shepherd announced his July 2, 2017 column would be his last after 30 years. Starting the next week, columns were credited to "the Editors at Andrews McMeel". The September 9, 2022 column announced Shepherd died the previous day.

References

External links
 News of the Weird web site
 News of the Weird Daily
 Weird Universe

Columns (periodical)